Baseball was contested at the 2017 Summer Universiade from August 20 to 29 in Taipei City and New Taipei City, Taiwan. The tournament was only for men.

Medal summary

Medal table

Men 
Eight teams participated in the men's tournament.

Teams 

Group A

Group B

Group stage

Group A

Group B

Final stage

Consolation round

7th place

5th place

Super round

Bronze medal game

Gold medal game

Final standing

References

External links
Result book – Baseball

2017
2017 Summer Universiade events
2017 in baseball